Greater Montreal is the most populous metropolitan area in Quebec and the second most populous in Canada after Greater Toronto.

This level of government is headed by a president (currently Montreal mayor Valérie Plante).

The inner ring is composed of densely populated municipalities located in close proximity to Downtown Montreal. It includes the entire Island of Montreal, Laval, and the Urban Agglomeration of Longueuil. Due to their proximity to Montreal's downtown core, some additional suburbs on the South Shore (Brossard, Saint-Lambert, and Boucherville) are usually included in the inner ring, despite their location on the mainland.

The outer ring is composed of low-density municipalities located on the fringe of Metropolitan Montreal. Most of these cities and towns are semi-rural. Specifically, the term off-island suburbs refers to those suburbs that are located on the North Shore of the Mille-Îles River, those on the South Shore that were never included in the megacity of Longueuil, and those on the Vaudreuil-Soulanges Peninsula.

Largest cities

Cities and towns

Only a portion of the municipalities and MRC's located in geographical entities highlighted in light gray are part of the CMM/CMA.
There are 82 municipalities that are part of the MMC and 91 municipalities that are part of the CMA. 
There are 79 municipalities that overlap between the two, with 3 municipalities being part of the MMC but not the CMA, and 12 municipalities being part of the CMA but not the MMC.
Kanesatake and Kahnawake are not included in the previous counts.

Demographics

Ethnicity 

Note: Totals greater than 100% due to multiple origin responses.

Language

Transportation

Exo operates the region's commuter rail and metropolitan bus services, and is the second busiest such system in Canada after Toronto's GO Transit. Established in June 2007, Exo's commuter rail system has six lines linking the downtown core with communities as far west as Hudson, as Far south as Mont-Saint-Hilaire, as far east as Mascouche, and as far north as Saint-Jérôme.

Along with Exo, a sister agency, the Autorité régionale de transport métropolitain (ARTM) plans, integrates, and coordinates public transport across Greater Montreal, including the Island of Montreal, Laval (Île Jésus), and communities along both the north shore of the Rivière des Mille-Îles and the south shore of the Saint Lawrence River. The ARTM's mandate also includes the management of reserved High-occupancy vehicle lanes, metropolitan bus terminuses, park-and-ride lots, and a budget of $163 million, which is shared amongst the transit corporations and inter-municipal public transit organizations.

The Exo/ARTM's territory spans 63 municipalities and one native reserve, 13 regional county municipalities, and 21 transit authorities. It serves a population of approximately 3.7 million people who make more than 750,000 trips daily.

The major transit commissions under the ARTM are:
 Société de transport de Montréal, serving the Island of Montreal
 Société de transport de Laval, serving the city of Laval
 Réseau de transport de Longueuil, serving the Urban agglomeration of Longueuil

Education

(In Montreal, except where otherwise noted.)

See also
 Montreal Urban Community

Notes 
Group 1

Group 2

Group 3

Notes

References

External links
  Metropolitan Community of Montreal website
 Act respecting the Communauté métropolitaine de Montréal (provincial statute)
Greater Montreal Area Restaurants
  Greater Montreal Area map in .pdf

 
Municipal government of Montreal
Metropolitan areas of Quebec